Marble is an unincorporated community in Clarion County, Pennsylvania, United States. Marble has a post office with ZIP code 16334.

References

Unincorporated communities in Clarion County, Pennsylvania
Unincorporated communities in Pennsylvania